Bina Štampe Žmavc (born October 4, 1951, in Celje) is a Slovene writer, poet, director and translator.

Biography
She was born on October 4, 1951 in Celje. She visited both primary and grammar schools in Celje. After the grammar school she studied comparative literature and literary theory at the Faculty of Arts in Ljubljana. As a graduate she employed herself in the field of education and taught for five years. She occupied herself with music and theatre as well. She was the leader of the infant improvisational theatre at Experimental Theatre Celje for 13 years, where she was director, stage manager and the author of texts. She is a member of the editorial board of the magazine Poetikon. Nowadays she is considered a classic of Slovene juvenile literature. She lives and works in Celje.

Work
She writes poems, prose and theatre plays, mostly for young readers. She started publishing poetry for adults in the grammar school's gazette named Brstiči, later on in Dialogi, Mentor and Obrazi as well. She has written three poetical collections of sonnets, namely Pesek v pesmi, Poševno sonce and Opoldnevi. Among the poetical collections, Čaroznanke (1990) is the largest one; their motivation has the origin in everyday life as well as reality and experiences of imagination. In the collection Nebeške kočije (1994) the author is focusing on the themes of universe, in which everything is connected, the themes of human being and nature; with her collection Klepetosnedke (1996) she returns to a child and his/her playful relation to the surroundings. Among the prose work we can find animal stories (Slike in zgodbe iz tisoč in enega pasjega dne, 1985) and various short fairy tales and nonsense texts (Popravljalnica sanj, 1992, Muc Mehkošapek, 1998).  A characteristic of her juvenile poetry is a rich poetical language. The poet invents new words, her poems are rhythmic. Moreover, imaginary words are typical of her juvenile prose. She also writes plays and puppet show works for children and chansons for adults.

Bibliography

Poetry for young people
 Čaroznanke, 1990 
 Nebeške kočije, 1994 
 Zrnca sonca, 1994 
 Klepetosnedke, 1996 
 Duhec Motimir, 2002 
 Škrat s prevelikimi ušesi, 2002 
 Snežroža, 2006 
 Vaze, 2008 
 Roža v srcu, 2010 
 Pol sonca, 2011

Prose for young people
 Slike in zgodbe iz tisoč in enega pasjega dne, 1985 
 Popravljalnica sanj, 1992 
 Kam je izginil sneg, 1993 
 Popravljalnica igrač, 1994 
 Mavricij in lučka Svečana, 1994 
 Ure kralja Mina, 1996 
 Vejak, 1997
 Bajka o svetlobi, 1997 
 Muc Mehkošapek, 1998 
 Pismonoša Hubert, 1998 
 Tri zvezde za celjske kneze, 2000 
 Drevo srca, 2001 
 Ukradene sanje, 2001 
 Škrat s prevelikimi ušesi, 2002 
 Pogašeni zmaj, 2003 
 Živa hiša, 2004 
 Vprašanja srca, 2008 
 Cesar in roža, 2009 
 Košastka Katka, 2009 
 Kako raste leto, 2010 
 Snežnosek, 2010

Plays for young people
 O velikem strahu Buholinu, 1985
 Cirkus Cigumigus, 1994
 Ure kralja Mina, 2000 
 Princesa kamnitih besed, 2000
 Ernica gosenica, 2000
 O petelinu in pavu, 2001 
 Mojca Pokrajculja, 2002

Poetry for adults
 Pesek v pesem, 1999 
 Poševno sonce, 2001 
 Opoldnevi, 2005 
 Sinjebradec, 2007

Radio plays
 Kam je izginil sneg, 1993
 Princesa kamnitih besed, 1996 
 Ure kralja Mina, 1996 
 O petelinu in pavu, 1997

Adaptations and translations
 Pujs v mlaki (priredba), 1994 
 Pojdiva domov, Mali medo (priredba), 1994 
 Mesto cvetja (priredba), 1994 
 Doktor Belko (prevod), 1999 
 Ali ima tudi kenguru mamo (prevod), 2000 
 Daj mi poljubček (prevod), 2001 
 Poljubček za lahko noč (prevod), 2001 
 Zajčkova knjiga pravljic (prevod), 2001 
 Zelo osamljena kresnička (prevod), 2002 
 Zelo tih čriček (prevod), 2002 
 Ali se ne počutiš dobro, Poldek? (prevod), 2002

Awards
 Zlata Linhartova značka ZKOS za režijo in besedilo igre O velikem strahu Buholinu, 1986.
 Nagrada zlata paličica za najboljše slovensko odrsko besedilo za otroke in mladino za dramski tekst Ure kralja Mina, 1994.
 Nagrada Radia Slovenija za izvirno radijsko igro za otroke za igro Princesa kamnitih besed, 1996.
 Nagrada Radia Slovenija za izvirno radijsko igro za otroke za igro Ernica gosenica, 1997.
 Klemenčičeva nagrada za izvirno lutkovno besedilo Društva slovenskih pisateljev in festivala "Klemenčičevi dnevi" za delo Ernica gosenica, 1999.
 Mednarodna bienalna nagrada Janusz Korczak, 2. nagrada za delo Muc Mehkošapek, 2000.
 Nagrada Radia Slovenija za izvirno radijsko igro za otroke za igro O kuri, ki je izmaknila pesem, 2003.
 Nagrada desetnica za otroško in mladinsko književnost za pesniško zbirko Živa hiša, 2007.
 Nagrada večernica za delo Cesar in roža, 2009.
 Nagrada desetnica za najboljše otroško in mladinsko delo za zbirko pravljic Cesar in roža, 2011.

Sources and literature
 Cankarjeva založba, Leksikon slovenska književnost, Ljubljana, 1996
 A. Lutar Ivanc, Album slovenskih književnikov, MK, Ljubljana 2006
 Alenka Kepic Mohar, Šolski album slovenskih književnikov, MK, Ljubljana, 2007
 Bina Štampe Žmavc, Snežroža, Celje, 2007
Bina Štampe Žmavc
Wikipedija- Bina Štampe Žmavc

External links
 Društvo slovenskih pisateljev

1951 births
Living people
Slovenian women poets
Slovenian poets
Slovenian theatre directors
Slovenian translators
Writers from Celje
University of Ljubljana alumni